Mohammed Abdullah Rasul, Born: 1903, Died: 21 November 1991, was an Indian politician. He belonged to the Communist Party of India (Marxist). M.A. Rasul was a prominent leader of the peasants' movement and served as minister in the West Bengal state government for a short period in the 1960s.

OBITUARY:

EXTRACT FOR“ THE PROCEEDINGS OF THE WEST BENGAL LEGISLATIVE ASSEMBLY DATED 6th MARCH, 1992.

MR. SPEAKER : Hon'ble Members, I rise to perform a melancholy duty to refer to the sad demise of the Ex—Ministers of this State, sitting as well as ex-members of this Legislature and other personalities renowned in their spheres who passed away after the last session of the Assembly.

***      ***     ***

Shri Md. Abdullah Rasul, a freedom fighter, a former Minister of the Government of West Bengal, one of the founders of the All India Kisan Sabha and a member of the Secretariat of the Communist-Party of India (Marxist) West Bengal State Committee died on 21 November 1991. He was born in 1903 in the district of Burdwan. He got his education at Memari, Burdwan. Having finished the school education, he joined Government Service but in 1921 he resigned from the service for the sake of taking part in the non-co-operation movement launched against the imperialist foreign ruler. He was arrested in December, 1921 as a 'Satya-grahi'. He acted as the Secretary of the Burdwan District Khilafat Committee during the period 1922-23. In 1922, he became a member of the District Congress Committee of Bengal.

He spent the period from 1926 to 1929 at Lahore to study Islamic History and comparative Religion. He also worked as an Editor of the 'Light', an English Weekly of Lahore. On his return to Calcutta, he associated himself with the 'Bombay Chronicle' and 'Al-Balagh', a Cairo Daily in Arabic, as their Calcutta Correspondent. He was arrested in 1932 for having taken part in the freedom movement. With the help of some friends he published an English weekly named 'The Comrade' during the period from 1937 to 1939.

In 1938, he got the membership of the Communist Party of India and became a fulltimer of the Party. He devoted himself to the task of organizing the farmers and was connected with the peasant movement till the last day of his life. He was elected General Secretary of the Bengal Provincial Krishak Sabha. In 1940-41, he was the General Secretary of the All India Krishak Sabha.

When the party was banned in 1940, Shri Rasul went underground. After the lifting of ban on the party in July 1942, he was arrested in Mymansingh.

In 1946-47, he took part in the 'Tebhaga Movement' launched by the 'Krishak Sabha'.

In 1947 he was elected General Secretary of the All India Krishak Sabha.

He was elected a member of the West Bengal Legislative Council in 1960. He was the Minister- in—Charge of Transport Department of the Second United Front Ministry of West Bengal in 1969.

He was elected a member of the Central Committee of the Communist Party of India (Marxist) in 1982.

As a representative of the All India Krishak Sabha, he went to the countries like the U.S.S.R, Czechoslovakia, Iraq. He visited Syria as a representative of the Party.

Shri Rasul was the author of several books written in Bengal viz. 'Krishak Sabhar Itihash', 'Communism Kahake Bale', 'Santal Bidroher Kahini', apart from some novels such as 'Abad' and 'Sahar Theke Grame'.

At his death the country has lost a veteran politician, a dynamic leader of the peasant front and a firm but pleasant personality.

Early political activity
Rasul hailed from Burdwan. Rasul was a leader of the peasant movement. Rasul was arrested during the 1959 Food Movement. In January 1936 he was one of the leaders, gathered in Meerut, that were tasked with convening the founding conference of the All India Kisan Sabha in Lucknow. As a political activist, Rasul was an associate of Muzaffar Ahmed. Around 1943 Rasul was sent to Chittagong, to make contact with the Communist Party of Burma, but his trip was suspended due to a boat accident.

Independence, Partition and Tebhaga movement
Rasul was elected General Secretary of the All India Kisan Sabha at its 10th conference held in Sikandra Rao in 1947. At the time the Kisan Sabha was facing government repression. He resigned from this post in the early 1950s, in order to facilitate merger talks with the All India United Kisan Sabha (a break-away group). Following the Second Party Congress of the Communist Party of India, held in Calcutta in 1948, at which the Communist Party of Pakistan was founded, Rasul and a number of other Muslim party leaders were sent to East Pakistan to build the party there. Rasul's stay in Pakistan became short, however, and he soon returned to India. He was a leader of the Tebhaga movement.

Legislator and Minister
Rasul was a Member of the West Bengal Legislative Council. He was elected by the West Bengal Legislative Assembly. He was named Minister of Transport (leading the Transport branch of the Home Department) in the second United Front government of West Bengal, formed in February 1969. Rasul resigned as Minister of Transport after the West Bengal Legislative Council was abolished. Mohammed Amin was sworn in as new Minister of Transport on 4 February 1970.

Later years
The 26th conference of the All India Kisan Sabha (Ashoka Road) elected Rasul as Vice-President.

Rasul died on 21 November 1991, at the age of 88.

Bibliography

References

Communist Party of India (Marxist) politicians from West Bengal
1991 deaths
Members of the West Bengal Legislative Council
State cabinet ministers of West Bengal
People from Purba Bardhaman district